Cromer is a hamlet in the civil parish of Ardeley, Hertfordshire, England.

It is a small hamlet; however, it is noteworthy for possessing Hertfordshire's sole surviving post mill.
The current mill dates from 1681 on a site where a windmill has stood for over 600 years. The mill has been damaged several times, but was brought back into full working order in 1998 after receiving grants of over £50,000 from the Heritage Lottery Fund and English Heritage.
The mill first opened to the public in 1991, and has continued to do so ever since.

References

Hamlets in Hertfordshire
East Hertfordshire District